The Unconquered Country: A Life History is a novel by Geoff Ryman published in 1986.

Plot summary
The Unconquered Country: A Life History is a novel in which a fully organic civilization is ripped apart by political upheavals.

Reception
Dave Langford reviewed The Unconquered Country: A Life History for White Dwarf #83, and stated that "It packs a terrific punch. In its shorter Interzone form, it won two major awards. Sacha Ackerman's many line drawings work well with the text."

Reviews
Review by Faren Miller (1986) in Locus, #306 July 1986
Review by Brian Stableford (1986) in Fantasy Review, September 1986
Review by Maureen Porter (1986) in Vector 135
Review by Don D'Ammassa (1986) in Science Fiction Chronicle, #87 December 1986
Review by Andrew M. Andrews (1987) in Thrust, #28, Fall 1987
Review by David Pringle (1988) in Modern Fantasy: The Hundred Best Novels

References

1986 novels